Boomer the dog may refer to:

Boomer the dog, mascot of Port Vale F.C.
Character in U.S. television show 'Here's Boomer'